Peak is one of the 15 constituencies of the Central and Western District Council, Hong Kong. The seat elects one member of the council every four years. The seat is currently held by Jeremy Young Chit-on of the Liberal Party.

The constituency covers the Victoria Peak and Mid-Levels area with the estimated population of 19,447.

Councillors represented

Election results

2010s

2000s

1990s

Citations

References
2011 District Council Election Results (Central & Western)
2007 District Council Election Results (Central & Western)
2003 District Council Election Results (Central & Western)
1999 District Council Election Results (Central & Western)

Constituencies of Hong Kong
Constituencies of Central and Western District Council
1994 establishments in Hong Kong
Constituencies established in 1994
Mid-Levels
Victoria Peak